Calla Vita Urbanski-Petka (born June 26, 1960) is an American former pair skater. With Rocky Marval, she is the 1991 Skate America champion, the 1992 NHK Trophy bronze medalist, and a two-time U.S. national champion (1992–1993). They represented the United States at the 1992 Winter Olympics and finished tenth.

Personal life 
Urbanski was raised in Skokie, Illinois, the daughter of a radio engineer and a hair stylist. She worked double shifts as a waitress and barmaid during her skating career.

Career 
Competing with Michael Blicharski, Urbanski placed 6th at the 1988 U.S. Championships. Their partnership ended when he decided to join an ice show due to financial problems. She then competed two seasons with Mark Naylor but they split after finishing seventh at the 1990 Goodwill Games.

Urbanski teamed up with Rocky Marval in 1990. They were coached by Ronald Ludington in Wilmington, Delaware. The media dubbed the pair "The Waitress and the Truck Driver" because of their occupations. In the 1991–92 season, Urbanski/Marval won gold at the 1991 Skate America and at the 1992 U.S. Championships. They were named in the U.S. team to the 1992 Winter Olympics in Albertville, France and finished tenth. Both developed chest colds at the event and waited a day for medication because the approved type had initially run out. The pair placed seventh in the final event of the season, the 1992 World Championships.

In June 1992, Urbanski and Marval announced the end of their partnership. Both arranged tryouts with other skaters — Urbanski with Scott Kurttila and Marval with Natasha Kuchiki — but the two decided to reunite in late July. They competed together for one more season, winning bronze at the 1992 NHK Trophy and their second U.S. national title.

Urbanski then teamed up with Joseph Mero. After the pair finished seventh at the 1994 U.S. Championships, she reunited with Marval and turned professional, enjoying several successful years in the mid-1990s. She coached in Wilmington, Delaware and then in Florida.

Results

With Blicharski

With Naylor

With Marval

With Mero

Professional
(with Marval)
1994 Challenge of Champions: 4
1994 Goodwill Games: 6
1994 U.S. Open: 3
1995 Challenge of Champions: 2
1995 Legends Championships: 4
1995 Rider's Skating Championship: 4
1996 Canadian Professional Championships: 4
1996 Masters Miko: 3
1996 The Professional Championships: 5
1996 U.S. Professional Championships: 3
1997 Challenge of Champions: WD
1998 World Professional Championships: 3

References

Navigation

1960 births
American female pair skaters
Figure skaters at the 1992 Winter Olympics
Olympic figure skaters of the United States
Living people
Figure skaters from Chicago
Universiade medalists in figure skating
Universiade bronze medalists for the United States
Competitors at the 1987 Winter Universiade
Competitors at the 1990 Goodwill Games
21st-century American women